Glen Innes railway station is located on the North Island Main Trunk line in New Zealand. Eastern Line services of the Auckland railway network are the only regular services that stop at the station. It has an island platform layout. Every hour it has at least three services towards Manukau and at least three towards Britomart. In 2006 the station had a major upgrade and is one of the most used non-terminus stations by the public.

History
The station was originally constructed, along with five others, in 1929 on the route of the Westfield Deviation, which was being built to divert the Auckland–Westfield section of the North Island Main Trunk line (NIMT) via a flatter, faster eastern route to link up with the original NIMT tracks at Westfield Junction.

Services 
Auckland One Rail, on behalf of Auckland Transport, operates suburban services between Britomart and Manukau via Glen Innes. The basic weekday off-peak timetable is:
3 tph to Britomart
3 tph to Manukau

Bus routes 75, 650, 743, 744, 747, 762 and the Tāmaki Link serve Glen Innes station.

See also 
 List of Auckland railway stations

References 

Rail transport in Auckland
Railway stations in New Zealand
Railway stations opened in 1930